Abdulqader Hikmat Sarhan (born August 19, 1987) is a male Qatari Taekwondo practitioner. He won the gold medal in the welterweight category (-78 kg) at the 2006 Asian Games, and competed at the 2008 Summer Olympics.
However he lost in his first match against Rashad Ahmadov (Azerbaijan) at Beijing.

External links
 Abdulqader Hikmat at NBC Olympics website
 
 
 

1987 births
Living people
Taekwondo practitioners at the 2008 Summer Olympics
Qatari male taekwondo practitioners
Olympic taekwondo practitioners of Qatar
Asian Games medalists in taekwondo
Taekwondo practitioners at the 2002 Asian Games
Taekwondo practitioners at the 2006 Asian Games
Asian Games gold medalists for Qatar
Medalists at the 2006 Asian Games